Eagle Mountain is a city in Utah County, Utah. It is part of the Provo–Orem metropolitan area. The city is located to the west as well as north of the Lake Mountains, which are west of Utah Lake. It was incorporated on 3 December 1996 and had been rapidly growing. The population was 43,623 at the 2020 census. Although Eagle Mountain was a town in 2000, it has since been classified as a fourth-class city by state law. In its short history, the city has quickly become known for its rapid growth.

History
The area is home to a number of natural landmarks, including a site along the original Pony Express trail and 1,800-year-old rock art petroglyphs carved by ancient Fremont Indians. In 2011 Eagle Mountain extended further west with the annexation of the White Hills neighborhood, which had about 400 residents, as well as an area that is part of the Pole Canyon development plan. The land outside of White Hills was almost 2,900 acres.

Geography 
Eagle Mountain is located at the western and northern bases of the Lake Mountains in the flat Cedar Valley east and northeast of the town of Cedar Fort.

Climate 
Eagle Mountain's climate varies drastically between the northeastern Ranches area and the southwestern City Center area. Despite being further south than Salt Lake City, both areas have cooler temperatures due to sitting at a higher elevation. The Ranches section of the city has slightly milder temperatures since it is closer to the moderating impact of the Salt Lake and Utah Valleys as well as the Great Salt Lake, which gives it a climate more similar to Salt Lake City. The City Center area near Fairfield lies in the Cedar Valley, which cuts that area off from the moderating influence of the Salt Lake Valley and Great Salt lake. This causes nights to get significantly colder than in the Ranches but also puts it in a rain shadow causing less precipitation and more sunshine than the Ranches part of the city.

Under the Köppen climate classification, the climate of the Ranches area is classified as humid subtropical (Cfa) or hot-summer humid continental (Dfa) depending on which variant of the system is used. The City Center area is drier and cooler. The Köppen classification for this area is cold semi-arid (BSk), although rainfall is nearly enough to classify the area as warm-summer humid continental (Dfb).

Demographics 

As of the census of 2010, there were 21,415 people, 5,111 households, and 4,741 families residing in the town. The population density was 513.6 inhabitants per square mile (20.0/km2). There were 5,546 housing units at an average density of 133 per square mile. The racial makeup of the town was 91.9% White, 0.6% African American, 0.5% American Indian and Alaskan Native, 0.6% Asian, 0.6% Pacific Islander, 2.7% from other races, and 3.1% from two or more races. Hispanic or Latino of any race were 8.6% of the population.

There were 5,111 households, of which 72.9% had children under 18 living with them, 84.7% were married couples living together, 5.6% had a female householder with no husband present, and 7.2% were non-families. 5.0% of all households were made up of individuals, and 0.3% had someone living alone who was 65 years of age or older. The average household size was 4.19, and the average family size was 4.34.

In the town, the population was spread out, with 49.5% under 18, 4.6% from 20 to 24, 35.7% from 25 to 44, 8.0% from 45 to 64, and 1.8% who were 65 years of age or older. The median age was 20.3 years.

According to the U.S. Census Bureau's 2007-2011 statistics, the median income for a household in the city was $64,676. The per capita income for the town was $17,814 (U.S. Census Bureau 2007-2011). About 7.6% of the population was below the poverty line.

In 2015, Eagle Mountain was the 10th most conservative city in the United States as judged by political donations.

Parks and recreation 

The city lists four regional parks and about 35 local parks. Eagle Mountain City parks are identified on the city's Parks Finder Map. In 2009, Eagle Mountain opened the Mountain Ranch Bike Park. This park is the first of its kind on the Wasatch Front. It features a jump line, two slopestyle tracks, a single track network, and a skills area with a pump track and wood features.

On January 20, 2015 the city council approved budget for expanding Cory B Wride Memorial park.

Government
Eagle Mountain City has a six-member Traditional Council form of government. The Mayor is a 
non-voting member of the Council except in the situation of a tie vote. The mayor acts as an elected executive, with the city council functioning with legislative powers. Eagle Mountain, by ordinance, offers candidates for mayor the option of declaring candidacy as the primary source of income at $70,000 per year or a secondary source of income at $27,700. The mayor may select a chief administrative officer to oversee the different departments. The current mayor is Tom Westmoreland who took office in January 2018. Eagle Mountain City has seen a voting history from 3% (2014) of registered voter to 95% (1997) of registered voters participating in an election over the course of its incorporation.

Education 
Eagle Mountain is located in the Alpine School District and currently has seven elementary schools (Eagle Valley, Hidden Hollow, Mountain Trails, Pony Express, Blackridge, Brookhaven, and Silver Lake). Frontier Middle School serves students in grades 7–8 except those in the Silverlake area, who attend Vista Heights Middle School in Saratoga Springs. Cedar Valley High School opened in August 2019. Some in the Silverlake area attend Westlake High School. Samuel Jarman is the superintendent of schools.

The city also has two public charter schools (The Ranches Academy and Rockwell Charter High School).

Infrastructure

Transportation
The six major roads running into Eagle Mountain are Utah State Route 73, which runs through the northern part of the city and along its western edge into Cedar Fort, Eagle Mountain Blvd, which goes straight to the city center, Ranches Pkwy which provides access to the Ranches from Utah State Route 73, Aviator Ave which runs from Eagle Mountain Blvd to Pony Express Pkwy by the new Cedar Valley High School, Pole Canyon Blvd which provides access from White Hills to City Center, and Pony Express Pkwy, which was extended east to Redwood road in Saratoga Springs in 2010. This was done to facilitate access with the rest of Utah County via connection with Pioneer Crossing, the east-west connector from Redwood Road to I-15.

SR-73, Eagle Mountain Boulevard, and Ranches Parkway provide regional access to the city from Salt Lake Valley, and Pioneer Crossing, Redwood Road, and Pony Express Parkway provide access to the city from Utah County, although the city center sits at least  from the two valleys' main transportation corridor along Interstate 15. The Utah Department of Transportation is in the process of building a western freeway for the Salt Lake Valley (the Mountain View Corridor), which will connect to SR-73 only a few miles from the city.

In 2008, the Utah Transit Authority (UTA) began service on an express bus route (#806) into Eagle Mountain. It is the first UTA bus to service the city.

Notable people 

 David Blair, Paralympic discus thrower
 Daniel Burton, computer programmer and bicycle enthusiast
Gregg Hale – guitar player for multi-platinum selling British band Spiritualized
 J. LaMoine Jenson, leader of Apostolic United Brethren (2005-2014)
 David Lifferth, former member of the Utah House of Representatives (2013–2017)
 Noelle Pikus-Pace, retired skeleton racer
 Eric James Stone, author

See also

 List of cities and towns in Utah

References

External links

 

New Urbanism communities
Planned cities in the United States
Cities in Utah
Cities in Utah County, Utah
Populated places established in 1996
Provo–Orem metropolitan area
1996 establishments in Utah